John Finlay Luxton  (14 August 1923 – 29 August 2005) was a dairy farmer and New Zealand Member of Parliament.

Biography

Luxton was born in 1923 in Waitoa, between Morrinsville and Te Aroha. He attended the local primary school, followed by Hamilton Technical College. After leaving school, he was a dairy farmer in Waitoa. He became prominent in the Waikato branch of Federated Farmers, serving as dominion councillor before his election to Parliament. He continued a family involvement with the Tatua Dairy Company as a director for several years.

He represented the predominantly rural electorate for 21 years to 1987. He was elected Chairman of Committees in 1976, a position he held until National's defeat in 1984. He was particularly interested in Pacific Island affairs, and in 1976 led a Government-sponsored tour of eight Pacific nations to investigate local industries, with a view to increasing New Zealand involvement there.

On his retirement from politics in 1987, his son John Luxton succeeded him in the Matamata (later ) electorate, from 1987 to 1999.

After politics, Luxton took an active part in his family's horticulture block in Katikati.

In the 1987 Queen's Birthday Honours, Luxton was appointed a Companion of the Queen's Service Order for public services. He died in 2005, aged 82, in Morrinsville, and was survived by his wife, Margaret, and their four children.

Notes

References

|-

|-

1923 births
2005 deaths
Companions of the Queen's Service Order
New Zealand farmers
New Zealand National Party MPs
New Zealand MPs for North Island electorates
Members of the New Zealand House of Representatives
20th-century New Zealand politicians